Leonard Ambrose Cundell (1879 Liddington, Wiltshire - 15, December 1939 Blewburton Hall, Aston Tirrold, Berkshire (now Oxfordshire)) was a well known English racehorse trainer in the 1930s.

Early years
Len was the second son of farmer and butcher, Matthew Henry Cundell, and his wife, Emma Willis, of Coley Park Farm, near Reading in Berkshire, where he grew up.

Racehorse training
Len had stables at Chilton in Oxfordshire which were taken over, by compulsory purchase, by the British government about 1937 in order to build RAF Harwell.

A stone marking the end of the runway records that aircraft of No 38 Group RAF took off on the night of 5 June 1944 with troops of the 6th Airborne Division who were the first British soldiers to land in Normandy in the main assault for the liberation of Europe. After World War II RAF Harwell was taken over by the UK Atomic Energy Authority.

Len Cundell moved from the Bungalow stables at Chilton to Blewburton Hall stables at Aston Tirrold. His best horse was Noble Star who, as a four-year-old, won the Cesarewitch in 1931.

The racehorses could not be kept following the outbreak of World War II. Some were given away to local farmers to ride while others had to be shot. Len died suddenly just before Christmas 1939.

Legacy
His cousins Ken Cundell and Frank Cundell, and his nephew Jack Waugh, the son of Len's sister Letitia, also became successful racehorse trainers and gained experience in his yard. Ken Cundell was one of the first to recognise Lester Piggot's outstanding talents

References

McKee Jane, Trainer, The Story of a Racehorse Training Dynasty, Finial Publishing 2010, 
Obituary of Ken Cundell, The Times, 14 October 2008
Len Cundell at the National Horseracing Museum website

British racehorse trainers
1879 births
1939 deaths
People from the Borough of Swindon
People from Reading, Berkshire
People from Vale of White Horse (district)
People from Aston Tirrold